Gijón Baloncesto was a basketball team based in Gijón, Asturias, Spain.

History
Gijón Baloncesto was established in 1982, after taking over the franchise of another local team, Real Grupo de Cultura Covadonga, who was undergoing financial difficulties. In its first year, the club played in the third tier and immediately promoted to Primera División B, the second division in the Spanish league system.

GB continued playing in the second tier from 1984 to 1995, when the club achieves promotion to Liga ACB after finishing runner-up of the 1994–95 Liga EBA and beating Lucentum in the semifinal game. The club only remained one season and could not avoid relegation by losing the relegation playoffs against Ourense by 1–3.

From 1996 to 1999, Gijón Baloncesto played in the new second league: LEB. It came back to ACB in 1999 by beating Menorca 3–0 in the semifinal of the promotion playoffs. In this second era in ACB, Gijón Baloncesto remained for three seasons until the relegation in 2002. After the relegation, the club started its decline until being relegated to the third tier in 2007 and finally being dissolved in 2009.

Sponsorship

IVECO: 1983–1984
Trébol: 1984–1985
Lagisa: 1985–1992
CLAS: 1992–1993
Trébol: 1993–1995
Cabitel: 1998–2000
Isastur: 2002–2003
Calefacciones Farho: 2003–2008
Viopisa: 2008–2009

Head coaches

 Pedro Zorrozúa 1982–1983
 José Antonio Figueroa 1983–1984
 Ed Johnson 1984–1985, 1988–1989, 1991
 Ricardo Hevia 1985–1987
 Emilio de Diego 1987
 Trifón Poch 1987–1988
 Eduardo Ayuso 1988
 Antonio Garrido 1990–1991, 1992
 Víctor Lago 1989, 1991–1992, 1992
 Ángel Martín-Benito 1993
 Bill McCammon 1993–1995
 Iñaki Iriarte 1995–1996
 Luis Casimiro 1996–1997
 Vicente Charro 1997
 Pepe Rodríguez 1997–1998
 Moncho López 1998–2002
 Moncho Fernández 2002–2005
 Diego Tobalina 2005–2006
 Joaquín Prado 2006–2007
 Jorge Elorduy 2007–2008
 Jenaro Díaz 2008–2009
 Guillermo Arenas 2021-2022

Season by season

Notable players

  Carles Marco
  Tomàs Jofresa
  Óscar Yebra
  Saúl Blanco
  Xavi Vallmajó
  Luis Scola 
  Hernán Jasen
  Bob Harstad
  James Blackwell
  Etdrick Bohannon
  Glen Whisby
  Michael Smith
  Brad Sellers
  Linton Townes
  Terquin Mott
  Lou Roe
  Eric Johnson
  Ryan Stack
  Etdrick Bohannon
  Stephen Howard
  Todd Fuller
  Thierry Zig
  Miroslav Pecarski
  Guilherme Giovannoni

Individual awards
ACB Most Valuable Player
Lou Roe – 2001

External links
Non official website

 
Defunct basketball teams in Spain
Former LEB Oro teams
Basketball teams established in 1982
Basketball teams disestablished in 2009
Former Liga ACB teams
Former LEB Plata teams
Former Liga EBA teams
1982 establishments in Spain
Sport in Gijón
Basketball teams in Asturias